José Miguel Rodríguez Espinosa is the current General Secretary of The International Astronomical Union (IAU). Espinosa is a Spanish astronomer working in particular in the field of active galaxies, star formation and the high redshift universe as well as in instrumentation. From September 1, 2019, to 2021, he was the Assistant Secretary General of the International Astronomical Union, replacing Ian Robson. He is the Secretary General of the Union for the 2021-2024 triennium.

References 

Living people
20th-century Spanish astronomers
21st-century Spanish astronomers
Year of birth missing (living people)